The Yilan Green Expo is an annual exhibition on environment held during spring in Yilan County, Taiwan.

History
The exhibition was firstly held in 2000.

Finance
In 2000-2019, the exhibition had received subsidies from the Council of Agriculture totaling NT$500 million and generated NT$10 billion in business.

Exhibitions

2016

The 17th Yilan Green Expo was held in Wulaoken River Valley on 26 March until 15 May 2016. The focus of the expo was on food safety and food security and advocation of green, healthy and sustainable lifestyle. It had five exhibition theme zones and 38 exhibitors.

2018
The 19th Yilan Green Expo was held on 31 March until 13 May 2018.

2019
The 20th Yilan Green Expo was held around Dongshan Railway Station and Dongshan River Ecoark on 30 March until 12 May 2019. It had a theme of Green Traveling. It also promoted ecological conservation, environmental education, environmental-friendly farming and circular economy.

References

External links

 

2000 establishments in Taiwan
Annual events in Taiwan
Recurring events established in 2000
Tourist attractions in Yilan County, Taiwan